Lemyra fallaciosa is a moth of the family Erebidae. It was described by Shōnen Matsumura in 1927. It is found in Taiwan.

References

fallaciosa
Moths described in 1927